Marie-Françoise Lubeth (born 20 November 1962 at Lille and deceased on 10 January 2009) was a French athlete, who specialised in the sprints.

Trained by José Gaumont, Marie-Françoise ran for the  Lille University Club and participated in 1984 Summer Olympics at Los Angeles. 
She attended the Olympics and was selected as an alternate for a relay but did not actually run.
She was selected twice for French athletics teams, including the 1985 Cup Of Europe.

After her sports career, she worked at Dron Hospital at Tourcoing as head of the gynecology department. Secretary of the Community of African  Churches of France, in 2008, she published Sprinteuse de Dieu (Sprinter of God ).

Marie-Francoise died at age 46 of breast cancer.  Her mother died of the same illness at around the same age as 
Marie-Francoise

References

External links 
 15 minute interview with Marie-Francois Lubeth (in French)

1962 births
2009 deaths
French Protestants
French female sprinters
20th-century French women
Sportspeople from Lille